Rhyacocnemis is a genus of white-legged damselfly in the family Platycnemididae. There are at least four described species in Rhyacocnemis.

Species
These four species belong to the genus Rhyacocnemis:
 Rhyacocnemis gassmanni Orr, Richards & Toko, 2019
 Rhyacocnemis leonorae (Lieftinck, 1949)
 Rhyacocnemis prothoracica Lieftinck, 1987
 Rhyacocnemis sufficiens Lieftinck, 1956

References

Further reading

 
 
 

Platycnemididae
Articles created by Qbugbot